Chen Wangting (1580–1660), courtesy name Zouting (奏廷), was a Ming dynasty officer who founded Chen-style t'ai chi ch'uan, one of the five major styles of the popular Chinese martial art. Sometimes called Chen Wang Ting, he devised the Chen family-style of t'ai chi ch'uan in his home of Chenjiagou, Wenxian county, Henan province after he retired there following the fall of the Ming dynasty.

Military career
During the Ming Dynasty, Chen served as Commander of the Wen County garrison, and was distinguished for his protection of merchant caravans in Henan and Shandong. After the Ming Dynasty ended and the reign of the Qing Dynasty began, Chen's military career was effectively over, and he retired to the family settlement.

Influence on t'ai chi ch'uan
Whether or not Chen invented the earliest form of t'ai chi ch'uan is in dispute. Traditional folklore and many lineages name the semi-mythical figure of Zhang Sanfeng, a Taoist monk, as the progenitor of the art.

Two widely documented theories of Chen's martial arts work exist: the first is that he learnt his arts from Wang Zongyue and the Wudang tradition developed by Zhang Sanfeng. The second theory — the one accepted by the Chen family, and supported by historical evidence — is that he combined his previous military experience and the theories of Jingluo and Daoyin with the popular teachings of Qi Jiguang. His complete work contained five smaller sets of forms, a 108-move Long Fist routine, and a Cannon Fist routine. Chen is also credited with the invention of the first push hands exercises. Chen also practiced a few Shaolin forms, and some historians postulate that Shaolin arts also had a significant influence on his t'ai chi, though none of the Taoist influences on Chen family t'ai chi exist in the Shaolin tradition.

Chen Wangting's next well-known successor was the 14th generation Chen Changxing (1771–1853), who was the direct teacher of the founder of Yang-style tai chi chuan: Yang Luchan.

T'ai chi ch'uan lineage tree with Chen-style focus

Notes

References

1580 births
1660 deaths
Chinese tai chi practitioners
Ming dynasty generals
Sportspeople from Henan
People from Jiaozuo
Generals from Henan